The Counsellors' Office of the State Council is an advisory agency directly under the State Council of People's Republic of China. The Central Institute of Culture and History is a research institute led by the same leadership and located in the same building. They are regarded as the official government think tanks.

Members 
The counsellors and the researchers are appointed by the Premier of the State Council.

Leadership 
The Office is led by a Chairman Wang Zhongwei, joined by three Vice Chairmen: Wang Weimin, Zhao Bing, Zhang Yantong. The institute is led by a President: Yuan Xingpei, with a Vice President: Feng Yuan

Counsellors 
Counsellors receive the title of Counsellor of the State Council. There are 56 counsellors:

 Liu Zhiren
 Huang Dangshi
 Xu Songling
 Liu Xiuchen
 Zhu Weijiu
 Zhang Yuanfang
 Zhang Hongtao
 Chen Quansheng
 Wang Guohua
 Cai Keqin
 Li Qingyun
 Liu Yanhua
 Zhang Kangkang
 Xia Bin
 Xu Lin
 Ma Li
 Tang Min
 Liu Huan
 Shi Yinhong
 Xu Yifan
 Deng Xiaohong
 He Xingliang
 Du Xuefang
 Deng Xiaonan
 Lin Yifu
 Du Ying
 Xie Boyang
 Li Yuguang
 Zhang Yuping
 Lin Yongjun
 Qian Yingyi
 Qiu Baoxing
 Fang Ning
 Wang Jingsheng
 Zhen Zhen
 Wang Huiyao
 Zhang Hongwu
 Yang Zhongqi
 Fan Xi’an
 Li Wu
 He Xiurong
 Shi Yong
 He Maochun
 Ke Jinhua
 Xu Xianping
 Hu Peiyuan

Research Fellows 
Research Fellows are members of the Counsellors' Office. There are 23 fellows:

 Tan Xiaoying
 Xu Xiaodong
 Wang Zhan
 Cai Laixing
 Cai Wanghuai
 Yao Jingyuan
 Li Kenong
 Feng Zhijun
 Wang Jingxia
 Yu Liang
 Yu Dan
 He Jiankun
 Li Chunyou
 Wang Dongjin
 Che Shujian
 Zhang Xinsheng
 Hu Heli
 Yang Limin
 Yin Chengjie
 Zhang Yuxiang
 Wu Yin
 Bao Hong
 Xi Jieying
 Yao Hong
 Tao Dawei
 Cao Erbao
 Bian Zhenjia
 Huang Yi
 Xie Weihe
 Xu Dingming
 Qin Xiaoming
 Huang Yao

Researchers 
Researchers are members of the Central Institute of Culture and History. There are 59 researchers:

 Sun Ji
 Cheng Yizhong
 Chen Yaoguang
 Hou Dechang
 Yang Tianshi
 Du Naisong
 Cheng Xi
 Bai Shaofan
 Huo Da
 Ouyang Zhongshi
 Fu Xinian
 Zhao Rengui
 Shen Peng
 Li Xueqin
 Jin Shangyi
 Shu Yi
 Han Meilin
 Jin Hongjun
 Chen Gaohua
 Jin Moru
 Fan Jinshi
 Yang Yanwen
 Zhang Lichen
 Guo Yizong
 Song Yugui
 Wang Liping
 Xue Yongnian
 Yang Lizhou
 Long Rui
 Pan Gongkai
 Rao Zongyi
 Zi Zhongyun
 Wang Meng
 Li Binghua
 Chen Zuwu
 Nima Zeren
 Zhao Derun
 Cheng Dali
 Dai Yi
 Ma Zhensheng
 Liu Mengxi
 Tao Siyan
 Yang Fujia
 Liang Xiaosheng
 Ye Jiaying
 Wang Yongyan
 Liu Dajun
 Chen Lai
 Wu Jingshan
 Li Yan
 Li Xiaoke
 Li Qiankuan
 Zhang Daning
 Zhong Chengxiang
 An Jiayao
 Tian Qing
 Chen Xiaoguang
 Wu Jiang
 Fan Di’an
 Chen Pingyuan

References

See also 

 
 

Government agencies of China